Adarsh Sein Anand (1 November 1936 – 1 December 2017) was the 29th Chief Justice of India, serving from 10 October 1998 to 31 October 2001.

Life 
Anand completed his studies from GGM Science College Jammu (erstwhile Prince of Wales college), Lucknow University, and University College London, and enrolled as an Advocate at the Bar Council on 9 November 1964. Having practised in Criminal Law, Constitutional Law, Election Law at the Punjab and Haryana High Court, he was appointed Additional Judge, Jammu and Kashmir High Court from 26 May 1975. He became the Chief Justice, Jammu and Kashmir High Court on 11 May 1985 and transferred to the Madras High Court on 1 November 1989. He was appointed a Judge of the Supreme Court of India, on 18 November 1991.

On 17 February 2003, he took over as the Chairperson of the National Human Rights Commission and was succeeded by Justice Rajendra Babu on 2 April 2007.

On February, 2010, he was appointed chairman of a five-member committee set up to examine the safety aspects of the Mullaperiyar Dam in Kerala. The panel submitted the report on 25 April 2012.

Honours
Anand was unanimously elected President of the International Institute of Human Rights Society in 1996. In 1997, he became the first Indian to be awarded the Fellowship of University College London, his alma mater. Anand was nominated as the Executive Chairman of the National Legal Services Authority (India), a statutory body, with effect from July 1997 in recognition of his contribution to legal aid for the poor. He was also unanimously elected Honorary Bencher of the Inner Temple this year. He is the author of the book, The Constitution of Jammu and Kashmir - Its Development and Comments. On 26 January 2008, Anand was honoured with the Padma Vibhushan, the second highest civilian award in India.

Awarded the Degree of LL.D. (Honoris Causa) at the Special Convocation held by Lucknow University on 14 March 1996.

Awarded Fellowship of the University College, London, on  19 May 1997.

Elected as Hony. Bencher of the Hon'ble Society of Inner Temple, London, in 1998.

Awarded Degree of D. Litt. (Honoris Causa) at the 9th Convocation held at Jammu University on 20 March 1999.

Awarded Honorary Fellowship for Life by the Society for Advanced Legal Studies, London, in October 2000.

Awarded Degree of LL.D. (Honoris Causa) by Punjab University, Chandigarh, on  28 December 2001.

Recipient of  'Shiromani Award - 2002' for Outstanding Achievements in the Field of Judiciary and Commitment to National Progress and Human Welfare on 30 August 2003.

Awarded Degree of LL.D. (Honoris Causa) by Banaras Hindu University on 29 November 2003, for Achievements and Contribution to the Development of Law and Protection of Human Rights.

Recipient of Plaque of Honour from the University of Lucknow for outstanding contribution to the Country and Society on  25 November 2004.

Awarded 'Dogra Ratan Award instituted by Council for Promotion of Dogri Language, Culture & History, Jammu on 27 October' 2006 at Jammu.

Awarded National Law Day award by the President of India for "Outstanding contribution to fair and efficient administration of justice" on 24 November 2007.

Landmark judgements
At least three landmark judgments given by Anand as the Judge of the Supreme Court have revealed his commitment to human rights and justice. 
 In the Nilabeti Behera case (1993), which he heard jointly with J.S. Verma, (later CJI) his separate judgment on the right of compensation in the cases of custodial deaths is hailed as a significant contribution to the protection of human rights. Anand held that public bodies and officials are expected to perform public duties properly and refrain from unlawful actions that are likely to violate individual rights under Article 21 of the Constitution.
 In the D.K. Basu case (1996), he laid down important safeguards against custodial torture. These safeguards are considered valuable in protecting the rights of prisoners.
 Anand's commitment to judicial discipline is also highlighted in his judgment in the V.C. Mishra case. The Supreme Court first sentenced the Chairman of the Bar Council of India, V.C. Mishra, for contempt of court and suspended him from practising. Later, a Bench headed by Anand ruled that the Supreme Court did not have the power to debar any advocate from practising even if it held him guilty of contempt.

Corruption allegations
Anand had a controversial tenure as Chief Justice of India. Activists have made four serious charges of corruption and abuse of office against Anand. No probe, however, was conducted on any of the allegations.

References

1936 births
2017 deaths
Alumni of University College London
Chief Justices of the Madras High Court
Chief justices of India
Recipients of the Padma Vibhushan in public affairs
Judges of the Jammu and Kashmir High Court
Chief Justices of the Jammu and Kashmir High Court
20th-century Indian judges
20th-century Indian lawyers
21st-century Indian lawyers
21st-century Indian judges